Lonchogenys ilisha is a species of characin found in the Rio Negro in Brazil and Colombia.  It is the only member of its genus.

References
 

Characidae
Monotypic fish genera
Freshwater fish of Brazil
Freshwater fish of Colombia
Fish described in 1927